Morgan Springs, also known as Morgan Spring, Morganspring, or Crawford, is an unincorporated community in Perry County, Alabama, United States.

History
Morgan Springs is named after a group of nearby springs, which in turn are named for William Morgan, an early settler of the area.
A post office operated under the name Morgan Springs from 1857 to 1925.

References

Unincorporated communities in Perry County, Alabama
Unincorporated communities in Alabama
1857 establishments in Alabama